The University of Palermo is a university located in Palermo, Italy, and founded in 1806. It is organized in 12 Faculties.

History
The University of Palermo was officially founded in 1806, although its earliest roots date back to 1498 when medicine and law were taught there. A little later in history, from the second half of the 16th century from their seat at the Collegio Massimo al Cassero, the Jesuit Fathers granted degrees in Theology and Philosophy - subjects in which they had been masters for over 200 years.

In 1767 they were expelled from the kingdom by King Ferdinand I, until 37 years later, when they returned to take their seat - which in the meantime had been turned into the Regia Accademia.

At this time, the same King Ferdinand decided to grant a good seat to the Accademia, moving its location to the Convent of the Teatini Fathers next to the Church of St. Giuseppe.

After the unification of Italy in 1860, the University of Palermo was modernized under the impetus of the chemist Stanislao Cannizzaro and the minister and specialist in Arab studies Michele Amari, more or less assuming its present appearance. Since 1984 the main building of the University, housing the Rector's office, is Palazzo Chiaramonte-Steri, one of the most important historical buildings in Palermo, built in 1307 and formerly the residence of the Chiaramonte. Not far from Palazzo Steri, on land formerly belonging to the Chiaramonte, the Botanical Gardens of Palermo constitute a further admirable pearl of the University.

Today, the University has grown to be an institution of about 2000 lecturers and 50,000 students in which research in all main fields of study is carried out. In the past few years the university has actively taken part in international cooperation programmes.

Organization

These are the 12 faculties in which the university is divided into:

 Faculty of Agriculture
 Faculty of Architecture
 Faculty of Arts and Humanities
 Faculty of Economics
 Faculty of Education
 Faculty of Engineering
 Faculty of Law
 Faculty of Mathematical, Physical and Natural Sciences
 Faculty of Medicine
 Faculty of Physics
 Faculty of Pharmacy
 Faculty of Political Sciences

Notable people

Alumni
 Giuseppe Alessi
 Giuseppe Ayala
 Ernesto Basile
 Giovanni Battista Filippo Basile
 Giulia Bongiorno
 Paolo Borsellino
 Gesualdo Bufalino
 Diego Cammarata
 Bruno Caruso
 Rocco Chinnici
 Francesco Crispi
 Salvatore Cuffaro
 Giovanni Falcone
 Mario Fasino
 Paolo Giaccone
 Giovanni Gioia
 Pietro Grasso
 Enrico La Loggia
 Giuseppe La Loggia
 Pio La Torre
 Salvatore Lauricella
 Rosario Livatino
 Filippo Mancuso
 Calogero Mannino
 Bernardo Mattarella
 Francesca Morvillo
 Gaetano Mosca
 Francesco Musotto
 Leoluca Orlando
 Vittorio Emanuele Orlando
 Ettore Paratore
 Emanuele Paternò
 Mino Pecorelli
 Valentino Picone
 Elda Pucci
 Franco Restivo
 Antonino Saetta
 Amedeo di Savoia
 Pietro Scaglione
 Renato Schifani
 Enzo Sellerio
 Antonio Starabba di Rudinì
 Carlo Vizzini
 Antonino Zichichi

Notable professors

 Sergio Mattarella, President of Italy
 Emilio Segrè, awarded the Nobel Prize in Physics in 1959
 Stanislao Cannizzaro, famous for the Cannizzaro reaction and for his influential role in the atomic-weight deliberations of the Karlsruhe Congress in 1860.
 Giuseppe Piazzi, his most famous discovery was the first dwarf planet, Ceres.
 Natalino Sapegno, He came to prominence as a leading scholar of fourteenth century Italian literature.
 Gaetano Giorgio Gemmellaro
 Antonino Salinas
 Gioacchino Scaduto

Notes and references

See also
 List of early modern universities in Europe
 List of Italian universities
 Palermo
 Orto botanico di Palermo
 Center for Sicilian Philological and Linguistic Studies

External links

  University of Palermo Website
  History of the University of Palermo
 Life at the University of Palermo
 

 
Palermo
Education in Palermo
Buildings and structures in Palermo
1806 establishments in the Kingdom of Sicily
1806 establishments in Italy